Chrysoula Saatsoglou-Paliadeli (Χρυσούλα Σαατσόγλου-Παλιαδέλη, born 8 July 1947 in Thessaloniki) is a Greek classical archaeologist and has been a member of the European Parliament for PASOK from 2009 to 2014.

Life 
Paliadeli studied classical archeology at the University of Thessaloniki, where she studied with Georgios Bakalakis and Manolis Andronikos. From 1972 to 1975, she was an assistant to Georgios Despinis, and from 1975 to 1984 to Manolis Andronikos. In 1984 she received her doctorate and became a university lecturer. In 1985, she became assistant professor, in 1998, associate professor and in 2004 full professor of Classical Archeology at the Aristotle University of Thessaloniki. 

From 1972 to 1975, she took part in the excavations at the Archaeological Park of Dion. Since 1972, she has been a collaborator in the excavations in Vergina, which she has directed since 2001.

Paliadeli was a member of the European Parliament from 2009 to 2014. In 2014, she was candidate for deputy governor of Thessaloniki.

Works

References

External links 

 Official website

Living people
1947 births
Greek archaeologists